Isin is an ancient city in Mesopotamia.

Isin or ISIN may also refer to:
 Isin Rural District, in Iran
 Isin, Kwara
 International Securities Identification Number
Isín, Spain

People with the given name
 Nisio Isin (born 1981), novelist